Master of the Flying Guillotine is the only studio album from American rapper Jumpsteady. Released on February 22, 2005, it peaked at #21 on the Billboard Top Heatseekers, #31 on the Top Independent Albums, and #78 on the Top R&B/Hip-Hop Albums charts.

Track listing

Personnel 
Information taken from Allmusic.

 Delusional — featured artist, producer, concept, background vocals
 Lavel - producer, engineer, mixing, background vocals
 Fritz the Cat — guitar, producer, engineer, mixing 
 Jumpsteady	— producer, concept 
 Jeff McAlear — engineer, mixing
 Polar Bear - producer
 Violent J — featured artist, producer, engineer, mixing
 Esham - producer
 Mike P - producer
 Samantha - featured artist
 Myzery - featured artist
 Ben Shader - co-producer

Charts

References 

2005 debut albums
Jumpsteady albums
Psychopathic Records albums